The Islamic Association in Sweden, (Arabic: الرابطة الأسلامية في السويد) (Swedish: Islamiska förbundet i Sverige, IFiS) was formed according to the records of the Swedish Tax Agency, the protocol of the constituent meeting of The Islamic Association in Sweden (IFiS) on January 27–28, 1995  in the presence of Ahmed Ghanem, Mostafa Kharraki, Mahmoud Aldebe, Zoheir Berrahmoune, Mahmoud Kalim and Sami al-Sarif. The initiator is the Stockholm organisation Islamiska Förbundet i Stockholm, which  runs Stockholm mosque and was found 1987. IFiS headquarters are located at Stockholm Mosque. According to the IFiS charter, it is a founding member in the Muslim Brotherhood-associated umbrella organisation Federation of Islamic Organisations in Europe whose guidelines it follows. It has started the following organisations, either alone or together with others:

 Islamic Relief in Sweden
 Muslim Youth of Sweden
 Islamiska informationsföreningen (IIF) (tr: Islamic information society)
Union of Muslim Students in Sweden (Al Khawarizmy), 
Imam's Association  
Sweden's Islamic Schools (SIS)
Muslim Woman Association
Sweden's Muslim Scouts
New Moon Cultural Association
Quran Reader Society 
Ibn Rushd Study Association 
Muslim Council of Sweden (SMR)

Omar Mustafa is chairman of IFiS since 2011. On 7 April 2013 he was elected to the party committee of the Swedish Social Democratic Party, which was noted by anti-racist magazine Expo as Mustafa, as chairman of IFiS, had invited Salah Sultan and Ragheb Al-Serjany both of whom had spread antisemitic views in al Jazeera interviews and that he also "likes" Egyptian imam Yousef Al-Qaradawi on Facebook. During the Easter of 2013, IFiS invited Yvonne Ridley and Azzam Tamimi to a seminar to a conference it organised together with Ibn Rushd and Sveriges Unga Muslimer. As a result of the discoveries, Mustafa left the Social Democratic Party committee and party.

IFiS organization chart 
IFiS is an umbrella organization.

See also 

 Islam in Sweden

References 



Islamic organizations based in Sweden